K-Rockathon was an annual music festival held in the Central New York region of New York sponsored by Galaxy Communications-owned radio stations WKLL/WKRL-FM/WKRH. These concerts were held at venues in Vernon, Syracuse, Oswego, Utica, and Weedsport, NY. Local bands are showcased at the event along with nationally-touring rock music acts. K-Rockathon has showcased many subgenres of rock music from alternative rock, to rap rock, to straight metal and drew hundreds of thousands to Central New York over its twenty year run.

History
The inaugural K-Rockathon was held on July 28, 1996, at the Vernon Downs race track in Vernon, NY. This was the same location through 1999, after which the event moved to the New York State Fairgrounds in Syracuse, New York, on July 9, 2000. The event returned to Vernon Downs after which it shifted locations almost annually. As of 2002, it drew approximately 30,000 fans annually. The festival status remains unknown as of 2019.

References

External links
 K-Rock website
 K-Rockathon website

Rock festivals in the United States
Culture of Syracuse, New York
Tourist attractions in Onondaga County, New York
Recurring events established in 1996
1996 establishments in New York (state)